Wim van Dolder (11 April 1903 – 13 February 1969) was a Dutch footballer. He played in three matches for the Netherlands national football team from 1928 to 1929.

References

External links
 

1903 births
1969 deaths
Dutch footballers
Netherlands international footballers
Place of birth missing
Association football defenders
SC 't Gooi players